Alsophila comosa is an obsolete synonym of a number of tree ferns:

 Alsophila comosa Wallich, 1829, syn. of Cyathea squamulata
 Alsophila comosa Scott, 1874, syn. of Cyathea khasyana
 Alsophila comosa C. Christensen, 1897, syn. of Cyathea elmeri